The 1906 Dickinson football team was an American football team that represented Dickinson College as an independent during the 1906 college football season. The team compiled a 3–4–2 record and outscored opponents by a total of 64 to 59. J. William Williams was the head coach.

Schedule

References

Dickinson
Dickinson Red Devils football seasons
Dickinson football